TheCall is an organization which sponsors prayer meetings led by Lou Engle along with other Christian leaders pastors in the United States. The meetings request prayer and fasting by Christians in protest against issues such as same-sex marriage and legal access to elective abortion. TheCall has drawn support from American Evangelical leaders, but has also been criticized for intolerance.

As of October 2018, Lou Engle has announced the ending of TheCall organization and will be focusing on his newest endeavor, Lou Engle Ministries. This was announced on TheCall's website, where all other pages have been deleted other than Engle's press release. TheBriefing, which is an email newsletter rallying followers around political issues pertaining to TheCall's goals and giving prophetic assignments for intercession will be continued by Engle's dear friends, Paul and Cheryl Amabile. A new movement, Contend, will have what Engle believes to have the same DNA as TheCall and will be led by David and Audry Kim who are his spiritual son and daughter.

Events
Originally planned as a co-ed youth version of Promise Keepers, TheCall hosts 12-hour or 24-hour events which combine prayer, sermons, and Christian rock worship and gospel music. The events are also known for their cultural and ethnic diversity, described in National Review as "the Breakfast Club of religious gatherings." Speakers at TheCall events frequently draw parallels between the pro-life movement and the Civil Rights Movement. TheCall is meant to be a gathering of fasting and prayer to confess personal and national sins, to pray for God's blessing on the nation, and for spiritual awakening among youth. Personal and national repentance among Christians and prayer for spiritual awakening has been the core focus of TheCall since its inception. Much of the events are devoted to prayer and sermons against abortion and homosexuality. TheCall events has been attended by prominent evangelical leaders such as Mike Huckabee, James Dobson, and Tony Perkins. Engle believes that gatherings such as TheCall are necessary to prevent divine judgment from taking place in the United States due to legalized abortion and the acceptance of homosexuality in American culture.

Uganda controversy
On May 2, 2010, Engle traveled to Uganda and organized a TheCall Rally at Makerere University in Kampala, Uganda. Before the trip he condemned the harsh penalties proposed in a bill that called for life imprisonment or the death penalty for Ugandan homosexuals with AIDS who engage in sexual relations, saying his ministry could not support it. Engle later said the church should examine its own sins and oppose violence against homosexuals, but he did not reject the criminalization of homosexuality.

In American politics 
TheCall has multiple supplementary movements and alternative names for their events that are focused on different areas of interest to the group. This includes TheResponse, which was a chain of stadium revivals focused on rallying audiences towards different topics or political candidates. Another event sponsored by TheCall and Lou Engle was RiseUp. This event was held in Washington D.C on October 9, 2017 and was created for Christian women to become advocates within the political sphere. Speakers at this event lead prayers for political figures such as Donald Trump and Barack Obama. Attendees were asked to pray for millions of children to be adopted, for the overturning of Roe v. Wade and for “the reform or the resigning of judges” within the Supreme Court. TheCall again has recently focused on rally Christian women with the Esther Fast. This three day fast held from March 8–11, 2017  called for women to pray for the support of the President of the United States, the ending of witchcraft, removing Anti-Semitic beliefs America, and for the reversal of Roe v. Wade.

Political endorsements

Rick Perry

On August 6, 2011 Rick Perry and Lou Engle held The Response. This event was an all-day prayer rally held in Houston at the Reliant Stadium in which Engle called for prayer and fasting in support of Perry's presidential campaign. Prior to this, two Texan pastors, Tom Schlueter of Arlington and Bob Long of San Marcos contacted Perry in hopes to share a new revelation that God had ordained Texas to be "The Prophet State" and that he was anointed by God to lead the state and nation into revival. Perry engages in this rhetoric and further promotes the belief that The Response was prophesied and anointed through the Book of Joel. At this event, Engle tells the audience that the day Perry announced his presidential campaign, it rained heavily for five hours. He then goes on to say that some see this as a sign of God's blessing on Perry's presidency.

Other associated politicians

Sam Brownback
Sarah Palin
Newt Gingrich
Michele Bachmann
Ted Cruz
Mike Huckabee

Gatherings
 October 3, 2002 (Seoul, South Korea) - Estimated 30,000
February 22, 2003 (Pasadena, California)
 March 1, 2005 (Gunsan, South Korea)
 April 5, 2008 (Montgomery, Alabama) - Estimated 20,000
 August 16, 2008 (Washington, D.C.)
 May 2, 2010 (Kampala, Uganda)

References

External links
 Official website

Christian movements
Evangelical parachurch organizations
2010 in the United States
Anti-abortion organizations in the United States
Charismatic and Pentecostal organizations
Organizations based in Kansas City, Missouri